The Papuan scrubwren (Aethomyias papuensis) is a species of bird in the family Acanthizidae. It is found in the highlands of New Guinea ; its natural habitat is subtropical or tropical moist montane forests.

This species was formerly placed in the genus Sericornis but following the publication of a molecular phylogenetic study of the scrubwrens in 2018, it was moved to the resurrected genus Aethomyias.

References

Papuan scrubwren
Papuan scrubwren
Taxonomy articles created by Polbot
Taxobox binomials not recognized by IUCN